In the Philippines, there exists a "tingi culture." This means buying and trading in small amounts—one stick of cigarette, one sachet of shampoo, one piece of egg, and the sort. This is usually done in the neighborhood sari-sari stores, but this has also become a trend in the corporate dimension. A lot of products from such as shampoo, instant coffee, and even cosmetic products are sold in sachets, carefully catered for the consumer behavior of having a "tingi culture."

This mentality has a lot to do with the state of poverty in the Philippines. A lot of individuals do not have the financial capacity to buy in bulk even when it is cheaper in the long run, as it seems to be more realistic to just buy things that they need for the moment.

This modern day culture has also brought upon an environmental problem—plastic pollution. Most of these products catered to the "tingi" market are plastics—sachets, plastic bags, and the sort. The average Filipino uses 591 pieces of sachets, 174 shopping bags, and 163 plastic labo bags, yearly. Every day, almost 57 million shopping bags are used throughout the Philippines, or roughly 20.6 billion pieces a year.

Up to this day, the tingi culture still exists, especially in the provinces. And despite the banning of plastics in some cities in the Philippines, there is still a long way to go in solving this.

References 

Economy of the Philippines
Philippine culture